"Mammoth" is a song by Belgian electronic DJ duo Dimitri Vegas & Like Mike and German DJ and producer Moguai. It was released on Beatport on 4 March 2013. The song charted in Belgium, Germany, France, and the Netherlands. The song also recently finished second in TomorrowLand Radio Ones top 1000 songs ever played at TomorrowLand. The song is synonymous with Dimitri Vegas and Like Mike's TomorrowLand sets. It was also used in the 2013 TomorrowLand after movie in a mashup with M83's hit Midnight City.

Track listing

Chart performance

Weekly charts

Year-end charts

Body Talk (Mammoth)

A year and a half later on 1 September 2014, "Mammoth" was re-released in a vocal version titled "Body Talk (Mammoth)" (also known as simply "Body Talk"), featuring vocals from English singer-songwriter Julian Perretta, co-written by American singer-songwriter Matthew Koma. Though this version was not as successful as the original instrumental, it peaked much higher in Belgium and also charted in France.

Music video
A music video to accompany the release of the vocal version was released on Spinnin' Records' YouTube channel on 9 August 2014 at a total length of three minutes and fifty-eight seconds. The video features model Lauren Niko, and is a one-shot for the first three and a half minutes until the song ends.

Track listing

Chart performance

Weekly charts

Year-end charts

References

2013 singles
2013 songs
2014 singles
2014 songs
Spinnin' Records singles
Songs written by Matthew Koma
Dimitri Vegas & Like Mike songs